Carlbrook is a historic home and estate located at Halifax, Halifax County, Virginia.  It was designed by Richmond architect Luther P. Hartsook and built in 1928–1930. The Carlsbrook house is a -story stone dwelling consisting of a hipped roof, five bay, central block and flanking one bay stone wings. The front facade features a recessed entrance with paired Corinthian order columns and a sandstone arch in the Classical Revival style.  Also on the property are the contributing elaborate stone garage, a lake with a stone spillway, stone bridges and garden features, and several smaller outbuildings.

The estate was the site of the therapeutic boarding Carlbrook School from 2002 to 2015.

It was listed on the National Register of Historic Places in 2000.

References

Houses on the National Register of Historic Places in Virginia
Neoclassical architecture in Virginia
Houses completed in 1930
Houses in Halifax County, Virginia
National Register of Historic Places in Halifax County, Virginia